Howard Smothers (born November 16, 1973) is a former American football offensive lineman who played three seasons in the Arena Football League with the Orlando Predators and Buffalo Destroyers. He was drafted by the Philadelphia Eagles in the seventh round of the 1995 NFL Draft. He played college football at Bethune-Cookman and high school football at Jean Ribault High School.

Professional career
Smothers was selected by the Philadelphia Eagles with the 248th pick in the 1995 NFL Draft.

Orlando Predators
Smothers played for the Orlando Predators in 1998.

Buffalo Destroyers
Smothers played for the Buffalo Destroyers from 1999 to 2000. He was released by the Destroyers on February 13, 2001.

Personal life
His son, Howard Smothers, played college football at Prairie View A&M University.

References

External links
Just Sports Stats

Living people
1973 births
Players of American football from Jacksonville, Florida
American football offensive linemen
American football defensive linemen
African-American players of American football
Bethune–Cookman Wildcats football players
Orlando Predators players
Buffalo Destroyers players
21st-century African-American sportspeople
20th-century African-American sportspeople